The 1976 NAIA Division I football season was the 21st season of college football sponsored by the NAIA, was the seventh season of play of the NAIA's top division for football.

The season was played from August to November 1976 and culminated in the 1976 NAIA Division I Champion Bowl, played on December 11, 1976 at Javelina Stadium on the campus of Texas A&I University in Kingsville, Texas. Texas A&I defeated Central Arkansas in the Champion Bowl, 26–0, to win their fifth, and third consecutive, NAIA national title.

Conference realignment

Conference changes
 This was the first season of play for the Central States Intercollegiate Conference. The conference, whose eight members were located in Kansas, Missouri, and Nebraska, was formed by two independent teams and six former members of the Great Plains Athletic and Nebraska College conferences.
 This was the final season of play for the Nebraska College Conference. The NCC, which had also been previously known as the Nebraska Intercollegiate Conference and Nebraska College Athletic Conference, had previously sponsored football since 1916.

Membership changes

Conference standings

Postseason

See also
 1976 NAIA Division II football season
 1976 NCAA Division I football season
 1976 NCAA Division II football season
 1976 NCAA Division III football season

References

 
NAIA Football National Championship